Delftia tsuruhatensis is a Gram-negative, rod-shaped, catalase- and oxidase-positive, motile bacterium from the Comamonadaceae family, which was isolated from a domestic wastewater treatment plant in Japan. D. tsuruhatensis is an opportunistic and emergent pathogen. All documented infections are healthcare-associated.

Biology and biochemistry 
Cells are slightly curved, short rod-shaped cells that occur singly or in pairs. Cells are 0.7-1.2 μm wide and 2.4-4.0 μm long.

Delftia tsuruhatensis can degrade phenolic compounds and aniline, which are often pollutants of soil and water.

Biofilm interactions
Delftia tsuruhatensis can inhibit quorum sensing and biofilm formation, which could inform new therapeutic drugs against antibiotic-resistant bacteria. D. tsuruhatensis demonstrated significant quorum sensing inhibition and suppression of biofilm formation against Pseudomonas aeruginosa and other pathogens. These activities also cause P. aeruginosa to be 2-3 times more susceptible to antibiotics.

References

External links
Type strain of Delftia tsuruhatensis at BacDive -  the Bacterial Diversity Metadatabase

Comamonadaceae
Bacteria described in 2003